Luca Daniel Scimia (born 5 January 1999) is a New Zealand professional footballer who plays as a midfielder for Italian Eccellenza club L'Aquila.

Career
Scimia is a youth academy graduate of Pescara. On 7 October 2018, he made his first team debut against Gubbio while on loan at Fano. He came on as a 76th minute substitute for Giordano Fioretti as the match ended in a goalless draw.

On 22 October 2021, Scimia joined Serie D club Notaresco. In July 2022, he moved to Eccellenza club L'Aquila.

Personal life
Born in New Zealand, Scimia's father is Italian and mother is New Zealander.

References

External links
 

1999 births
Living people
Association footballers from Auckland
Association football midfielders
New Zealand association footballers
Serie C players
Serie D players
Alma Juventus Fano 1906 players
Rende Calcio 1968 players
L'Aquila Calcio 1927 players
New Zealand expatriate association footballers
Expatriate footballers in Italy